Calaf is the main town in the northern portion of the comarca of the Anoia in 
Catalonia, Spain, situated on the Calaf Plain. The town holds an important weekly livestock market.

It is served by the main N-II road from Barcelona to Lleida, the RENFE railway line from Manresa to Lleida 
and the C-1412 road from Igualada to Ponts. Calaf also has an exit from the new C25 that crosses Catalonia from Girona to Lleida. The remains of Calaf castle dominate the town from a hilltop.

Subdivisions 
The village of La Pineda (population (2005): 195) is included within the municipality of Calaf.

References 

 Panareda Clopés, Josep Maria; Rios Calvet, Jaume; Rabella Vives, Josep Maria (1989). Guia de Catalunya, Barcelona: Caixa de Catalunya.  (Spanish).  (Catalan).

External links 

 Government data pages 
Information from the Diputació de Barcelona
Consorci Turístic de l'Alta Anoia
Casal de Calaf, association

Municipalities in Anoia
Populated places in Anoia